Bredebro is a small town with a population of 1,412 (1 January 2022) in Region of Southern Denmark in Denmark on the Jutland peninsula. The town was the original home of the ECCO shoe manufacturing company.

Until 1 January 2007 Bredebro was the seat of the former Bredebro Municipality (Danish, kommune).

Bredebro Municipality

The former Bredebro Municipality covered an area of 151 km2, and had a total population of 3,680 (2005). Its last mayor was Vagn Therkel Pedersen, a member of the Venstre (Liberal Party) political party.

Bredebo Municipality ceased to exist due to Kommunalreformen ("The Municipality Reform" of 2007). It was merged with Højer, Løgumkloster, Nørre-Rangstrup, Skærbæk, and Tønder municipalities to form the new Tønder Municipality.

External links
 Tønder municipality's official website 

 Weather forecast Bredebro, Denmark weather-atlas.com

References

 Municipal statistics: NetBorger Kommunefakta, delivered from KMD aka Kommunedata (Municipal Data)
 Municipal mergers and neighbors: Eniro new municipalities map

Cities and towns in the Region of Southern Denmark
Former municipalities of Denmark
Tønder Municipality